The 2000 Kärcher Canadian Junior Curling Championships were held February 5–13 at the Beausejour Curling Club in Moncton, New Brunswick. The winning teams represented Canada at the 2000 World Junior Curling Championships.

Men's

Teams

Standings

Results

Draw 1

Draw 2

Draw 3

Draw 4

Draw 5

Draw 6

Draw 7

Draw 8

Draw 9

Draw 10

Draw 11

Draw 12

Draw 13

Draw 14

Draw 15

Draw 16

Draw 17

Draw 18

Playoffs

Tiebreaker

Semifinal

Final

Women's

Teams

Standings

Results

Draw 1

Draw 2

Draw 3

Draw 4

Draw 5

Draw 6

Draw 7

Draw 8

Draw 9

Draw 10

Draw 11

Draw 12

Draw 13

Draw 14

Draw 15

Draw 16

Draw 17

Draw 18

Playoffs

Semifinal

Final

Qualification

Ontario
The Teranet Ontario Junior Curling Championships were held at the Bobcaygeon Curling Club in Bobcaygeon January 11–16.

Julie Reddick of Oakville defeated Jenn Hanna of Ottawa 9-3 in the women's final. Hanna had finished in the round tied for third with Carrie Lindner of Bradford. She beat Lindner in the tiebreaker 6-5 and Chrissy Cadorin of St. Catharines in the semifinal 8-6.

In the men's final, Jason Young of Burlington defeated Jamie Farnell of Bradford 7-5.

References

External links
Men's statistics
Women's statistics

Canadian Junior Curling Championships
Curling competitions in Moncton
Canadian Junior Curling Championships
2000 in New Brunswick
February 2000 sports events in Canada